Arthur Manukyan (born July 4, 1985) is an Armenian director and producer. He is known for being the producer and director of music videos of Armenian singers. He directed dozens of television projects and events.

Biography 
Arthur Manukyan was born on July 4, 1985, in Vagharshapat, Armenia. He finished Middle School in 2002 during which he was also attending to classes in Yerevan Dancing Art State College. He studied film directing in the Yerevan State Institute of Theatre and Cinematography (at the studio of Ruben Gevorgyants) from 2002 to 2008. In 2006, he won the Special Award at the "I am" film festival. From 2008, he started to work at the Public Radio of Armenia as the speaker of "Arevik" children and youth ensemble. From 2009 to 2011, he was the director of the "Witness" television program at the Public Television Company of Armenia. He started to work for ATV channel from 2009 as the director of "Good Morning", "The Flight", "Musical Box", "Pop Encyclopedia" and "Cosmic Show" (special offer from "Cosmopolitan Armenia") programs. From 2011 to 2012, he worked for "ArmNews" channel as a director. He has directed TV programs and mass events, such as the Armenian Stages of International Song Contest "Eurovision", New Year programs", concerts (concert for the 19th Anniversary Celebration of Armenia's Independence (2010), concert of "Amaras" dance band (2015), "Live in concert" by Erik Karapetyan (2015), Martin Mkrtchyan's concert at the Dolby Theatre live-performance auditorium (2016), solo concerts of Saro Tovmasyan (2018), Hripsime Hakobyan (2019) and Noro (2019, Dolby Theatre)). Arthur Manukyan has cooperated with huge companies as VTB Armenia, Evocabank, Gyumri Beer. He has directed around 200 music videos, concerts, TV projects, events and different ceremonies. He worked with many Armenian artists, such as Arame, André, Razmik Amyan, Emmy, Martin Mkrtchyan, Erik Karapetyan, Iveta Mukuchyan, Armenchik, Arminka, Saro, Nune Yesayan, Lilit Hovhannisyan, Christine Pepelyan, Mihran Tsarukyan, Arpi Gabrielyan, Arthur Grigoryan, Avet Barseghyan, Betty, Mika, Anna Avanesyan, Armenchik, Athena Manoukian, Sevak Khanaghyan, Sona Sarkisyan, Sevak Amroyan, Artsvik, Srbuk and others .

During this time Arthur has cooperated with Armenia TV, Armnews TV, ATV, Public TV Company of Armenia, PanArmenian TV.  
In 2011 he directed the Armenian National Selection of Junior Eurovision Son ContestFrom. 2013 he started to work or Armenia TV as the director of "Nane" program. He was nominated and won the "Best Director of Year" title at the World Armenian Entertainment Awards. He started to work at the Public Television Company of Armenia as a director where he directed the "Woman by Fate" (2014–2015) and "Benefice" (2 seasons, from 2016 to 2017) programs. In 2016, he directed the "Almighty Singer" program. 2016–2018 Arthur has worked with famous American Production "Global art"  in the position of Art Director. During 2017–2018 he directed the "Destinies Beyond the Ocean" TV program.։ In 2019 he organized the opening ceremony of ConIFA Artsakh 2019. Armenian phase of Junior Eurovision Song Contest 2019, RA Prime Minister's "Hero of Our Time" Award Ceremony in Gyumri Black Berd, Opening Ceremony of "Erebuni-Yerevan 2801" Official Event. 
Arthur also has directed events and ceremonies as the "September 21" Armenian independent day ceremony, "Anahit" awards, 2019 CONIFA European Football Cup which were hosted in Artsakh, Artavazd annual theatrical ceremony, "Tsitsernak" music awards.

Music videos of Eurovision

Eurovision 2017 

On March 18, 2017, the music video of Fly with Me was premiered (the song was released as a digital download on March 29, 2017, through Universal Music), and it was announced that it will be the song of Armenian in Eurovision Song Contest 2017. Arthur Manukyan was the director of the music video of that song.

According to Arthur Manukyan, the song conveyed so much emotion and at the same time caused so many different emotions that he decided to use different symbols in the music video: 

According to the Armenian version of the official website of Eurovision Song Contest, the music video also retains the song's melodic line and attempts to present different ethnic features. Performances and light effects reflected the sun's rays, which, as the song says, shine at the same temperature for everyone.

Eurovision 2018 

In December 2017, Khanagyan was announced as one of the competitors in Depi Evratesil 2018, the Armenian national selection for the Eurovision Song Contest 2018. On January 16, 2018, his song "Qami" was premiered. Khanagyan competed in the second semi-final of Depi Evratesil on February 22, 2018, and became one of the five qualifiers to advance to the final on February 25. On February 25, the song was chosen as the winner of the competition. The director of the music video of this song is Arthur Manukyan.

On March 16, 2018, a teaser of the music video was uploaded to Eurovision's official YouTube channel. It premiered on the same channel on March 21.

Eurovision 2019 

The music video for "Walking Out", a song by Armenian singer Srbuk which represented Armenia at the Eurovision Song Contest 2019 in Tel Aviv, Israel, directed by Arthur Manukyan, was teased on March 8, 2019. It was released on Eurovision's official YouTube channel on March 10. The music video was filmed in Armenfilm studio by Factory production.

According to Srbuk: 
According to Arthur Manukyan,

The music video mostly received positive reviews and has over 6 million views on YouTube.։

Eurovision 2020/ Europe Shine A Light 

In March 2020, he again directed the music video for Armenia's Eurovision entry, the Hip Hop and R&B inspired song Chains on You by Greek-Armenian singer-songwriter Athena Manoukian, which had been selected after winning The Armenian selection in February 2020. The video was released on March 13, and largely sees her in two surroundings – in front of, and on top of, a giant diamond, and on a throne.

Whilst Eurovision Song Contest 2020 was cancelled the following week, the music video, which had earned widespread praise from fans, would be featured in replacement entertainment such as Eurovision: Europe Shine a Light and Eurovision Song Celebration and got over 4 million YouTube views as of May 26, 2020. In a poll on the fan website Wiwibloggs, it was voted for by fans as their second favourite music video out of the would-be 2020 entries.

Works

Filmography

Music videos

Armenia in Eurovision and Junior Eurovision Song Contests

Music Videos

Performances

Depi Evratesil (Armenia's National Selection for Eurovision and Junior Eurovision Artists)

Concerts and Ceremonies

Awards 
 2006 – "I Am" international film festival, Special Award for "The Small Corner of The Big World" film
 2010 – 21st Century television award for the music video of Andre's "Don't Let" song as The Best Music Video
 2010 – "Top 10" award for the music video of Arpi Gabrielyan's "Love" song as The Best Music Video
 2012 – "Top 10" award for the music video of Erik Karapetyan's "Unreal" song as The Best Music Video
 2013 – 21st Century television award for the music video of Andre's "I Want to Hate You" song as the Best Music Video
 2014 – World Armenian Entertainment Awards for the music video of Andre's "I Want to Hate You" song as the Best Music Video
 2016 – Pan Armenian Entertainment Awards for Erik Karapetyan's "Live in Concert" as The Best Concert of The Year
 2016 – Pan Armenian Entertainment Awards for the music video of Armenchik's "Father" song as The Best Music Video
 2017 – Europe Armenian Music Awards 2017 for Benefice program as The Best TV Program

References 

Armenian directors
Armenian producers
Armenian film directors
People from Vagharshapat
1985 births
Living people